This is a list of all teams and players who have ended up as a runner-up in the final of the Cork Senior Hurling Championship since its inception in 1887.

By team

The 133 Cork Senior Championships have been lost by 38 different teams. Blackrock have lost the most finals. The most recent runners-up are Glen Rovers, who lost the 2021 final.

By year

Individual records

References